LCAC may refer to:

Hovercraft
 A generic term for an air cushioned landing craft, taken from US Navy designation "Landing Craft, Air Cushion".
 Landing Craft Air Cushion, a US Navy hull classification symbol for the Landing Craft Air Cushion-class hovercraft
 LCAC(L), a light assault hovercraft used by the Royal Navy and Marines
 Lebed-class LCAC, an air-cushioned landing craft used by the Soviet and later Russian Navy
 Type 726 LCAC, an air-cushioned landing craft used by the People's Liberation Army Navy
 Zubr-class LCAC, an air-cushioned landing craft used by the Russian, Hellenic, and People's Liberation Army Navies

Other
 Leicester Coritanian Athletics Club